Allison Sudradjat was AusAID's Minister Counsellor in Indonesia. Sudradjat was born in Narrogin, Western Australia, in 1966 to Kevin and Elaine Keevil. She was awarded a scholarship to Perth College, where she studied Indonesian, before winning an undergraduate scholarship to the Australian National University (ANU) in 1983. At ANU she undertook a degree in Asian Studies, completing her Honours year in 1986 after majoring in Indonesian and history.

Having completed Honours, Allison Sudradjat worked at the Indonesian embassy prior to traveling to Bandung, Indonesia to undertake a university scholarship at Padjadjaran University awarded by the Indonesian Government. It was at the Indonesian embassy in Canberra where Sudradjat met her future husband, Ris, whom she married in Jakarta in 1988.

Sudradjat began work in AusAID in 1989 and served in overseas postings in Indonesia and Papua New Guinea. While in Papua New Guinea Sudradjat managed the AusAID assistance during the 1997-98 drought, and was involved in the aftermath of the 1998 tsunami that hit the Aitape region.

She coordinated for AusAID the 2004 Boxing Day tsunami emergency relief effort provided by the Australian Government, and served as AusAID's foreign affairs representative in Indonesia. Later, in 2005, Sudradjat was appointed to the role of minister-counsellor.

Allison Sudradjat died in the crash of Garuda Indonesia Flight 200 on 7 March 2007.

In the AusAID magazine Focus, Alexander Downer, then Australia's Minister of Foreign Affairs, said of Allison Sudradjat:

On 18 March 2008, Stephen Smith, Australia's Minister for Foreign Affairs announced the inaugural winners of the prestigious Allison Sudradjat Scholarships. The six scholars will undertake Masters or PhD level courses, and include four from Indonesia and two from Papua New Guinea.

She is survived by her husband, Ris, and four children.

References

1966 births
2007 deaths
Australian public servants
Victims of aviation accidents or incidents in Indonesia
People from Narrogin, Western Australia
Padjadjaran University alumni
Australian people of Indonesian descent
Victims of aviation accidents or incidents in 2007